KZUW (88.5 FM) is a classical music radio station licensed to Reliance, Wyoming. The station is owned and operated by the University of Wyoming.

Signal
This includes good coverage in Green River and as far north as Reliance, the station's city of license. To the east, the station can likely be heard as far as Superior, Wyoming. Due to its location on the FM Dial (88.5), the FCC has limited the amount of power the station can carry. It shares tower space with KUWZ and the local NOAA Weather Radio station.

History
On November 19, 2008, the station was sold to the University of Wyoming and signed on June 16, 2009.

References

External links

ZUW
Radio stations established in 2009
ZUW
Classical music radio stations in the United States
ZUW